The Theban Tomb TT311 (MMA 508) is located in Deir el-Bahari, part of the Theban Necropolis, on the west bank of the Nile, opposite to Luxor. The tomb belongs to the Seal-bearer of the King of Lower Egypt named Kheti. The tomb was excavated by Winlock during the 1923 excavations on behalf of the Metropolitan Museum of Art. Kheti had a tomb near the funerary temple of king Mentuhotep II. The tomb was found heavily destroyed but there are still many remains of reliefs showing that it was once decorated. The burial chamber was better preserved and was also decorated.

See also
 List of Theban tombs
 List of MMA Tombs

References 

Theban tombs